Robert Barr (born 23 June 1988) is a Scottish professional footballer who plays as a midfielder for Ashfield.

Career
Born in Glasgow, Barr first played for St Johnstone, but failed to make it into the first team. After being released by St Johnstone he was given a chance by Paul Martin at Albion Rovers, before signing for Livingston manager Gary Bollan in January 2010. Livingston won the Scottish Third Division.

Before he was released by Livingston, Barr was sent to East Fife on loan for a period of three months and scored on his debut at home to Ayr United. In June 2013, he signed for Brechin City, and after two years at the club moved to Greenock Morton on a one-year deal. He scored his first goal for the club in a 4-2 win at Livingston on 5 September 2015.

Barr signed a pre-contract agreement on a two-year deal with league rivals Raith Rovers, with his signing being confirmed at the end of May 2016. Following the end of his contract, Barr was released by Raith at the end of the 2017–18 season. He signed for Dumbarton on 4 June 2018 and scored his first goal for the club in a 4-2 Scottish League Cup defeat to Kilmarnock a month later. After being an ever-present as the Sons finished sixth in Scottish League One Barr turned down a new deal to join Lowland League side East Stirlingshire.

Barr signed with Forfar Athletic in January 2020. He then moved to Cowdenbeath in July 2021.

Following the Blue Brazil's relegation from Scottish League Two, Barr left the club.  He joined West of Scotland Football League side Ashfield following a short trial.

Career statistics

Honours
Livingston
Third Division: 2009–10
Second Division: 2010–11

Individual

 2008–09 Scottish Third Division PFA Player of the Year

References

External links

1988 births
Living people
Scottish Football League players
St Johnstone F.C. players
Albion Rovers F.C. players
Brechin City F.C. players
Livingston F.C. players
Greenock Morton F.C. players
Raith Rovers F.C. players
Footballers from Glasgow
Scottish footballers
Scottish Professional Football League players
Association football wingers
East Fife F.C. players
Dumbarton F.C. players
East Stirlingshire F.C. players
Forfar Athletic F.C. players
Cowdenbeath F.C. players
Ashfield F.C. players
Lowland Football League players